Walter J. "Butch" Ireland, Jr. (June 15, 1923 – March 21, 2010) was an American politician and businessman.

Born in Kohler, Wisconsin, Ireland served in the United States Army Air Forces during World War II. Ireland went to Marquette University and was in the insurance business. Ireland served on the Sheboygan County, Wisconsin Board of Supervisors and a chairman of the county board. He served on the Lightfoot School Committee in Sheboygan Falls, Wisconsin. Ireland served in the Wisconsin State Assembly, from 1959 to 1961, and was a Republican. Ireland died at the Sunny Ridge Nursing Home in Sheboygan, Wisconsin.

Notes

People from Kohler, Wisconsin
Marquette University alumni
Military personnel from Wisconsin
United States Army Air Forces personnel of World War II
Businesspeople from Wisconsin
School board members in Wisconsin
County supervisors in Wisconsin
Republican Party members of the Wisconsin State Assembly
1923 births
2010 deaths
People from Sheboygan Falls, Wisconsin
20th-century American businesspeople